Moses Goli Ogwal is a Ugandan politician and a member of the Ugandan parliament from Dokolo North Constituency. He is a member of National Resistance movement (NRM). He served as the Director of Private Sector Development.

In the eleventh parliament, he serves on the Committee on East African Community Affairs.

References 

21st-century Ugandan politicians
National Resistance Movement politicians
Members of the Parliament of Uganda
Year of birth missing (living people)
Living people
Place of birth missing (living people)